Systemic bias, also called institutional bias, and related to structural bias, is the inherent tendency of a process to support particular outcomes. The term generally refers to human systems such as institutions. Institutional bias and structural bias can lead to institutional racism, and can also be used interchangeably. Institutional racism is a type of racism that is integrated into the laws, norms, and regulations of a society or establishment. Structural bias, in turn, has been defined more specifically in reference to racial inequities as "the normalized and legitimized range of policies, practices, and attitudes that routinely produce cumulative and chronic adverse outcomes for minority populations". The issues of systemic bias are dealt with extensively in the field of industrial organization economics. Systemic bias plays a part in systemic racism, a form of racism embedded as a normal practice within society or an organization.

It is not to be confused with the equivalent bias in non-human systems, such as measurement instruments or mathematical models used to estimate physical quantities, often called systematic bias.

In human institutions
Cognitive bias is inherent in the experiences, loyalties, and relationships of people in their daily lives, and new biases are constantly being discovered and addressed on both an ethical and political level. For example, the goal of affirmative action in the United States is to counter biases concerning gender, race, and ethnicity, by opening up institutional participation to people with a wider range of backgrounds, and hence a wider range of points of view. In India, the system of scheduled castes and tribes intends to address systemic bias caused by the controversial caste system, a system centered on organized discrimination based upon one's ancestry, not unlike the system that affirmative action aims to counter. Both the scheduling system and affirmative action mandate the hiring of citizens from within designated groups. However, without sufficient restrictions based upon the actual socio-economic standing of the recipients of the aid provided, these types of systems can allegedly result in the unintentional institutionalization of a reversed form of the same systemic bias, which works against the goal of rendering institutional participation open to people with a wider range of backgrounds.

Unconscious bias training has become common in many organizations, which may address both systemic and structural bias. Structural bias may be inherent in the practices and policies of the organization, such as hiring practices that favor social networking, or a grooming policy that disadvantages people with Afro-textured hair.

Major causes
The study of systemic bias as part of the field titled organizational behavior in industrial organization economics is studied in several principle modalities in both non-profit and for-profit institutions. The issue of concern is that patterns of behavior may develop within large institutions which become harmful to the productivity and viability of the larger institutions from which they develop, as well as the community they occupy. The three major categories of study for maladaptive organizational behavior and systemic bias are counterproductive work behavior, human resource mistreatment, and the amelioration of stress-inducing behavior.

Racism 
Racism is prejudice, discrimination or hostility towards other people because they are of a different racial or ethnic origin. Medical students conducted studies to investigate systemic biases associated with race. The result of the study showed that due to systemic bias, certain groups of people are marginalized due to race and differences, their professional careers are threatened, and more homework/responsibility is given to those in the minority group.

Counterproductive work behavior
Counterproductive work behavior, or CWB, consists of behavior by employees that harms or intends to harm organizations and people in organizations.

Mistreatment of human resources
There are several types of mistreatment that employees endure in organizations.

Abusive supervision
Abusive supervision is the extent to which a supervisor engages in a pattern of behavior that harms subordinates.

Bullying
Although definitions of bullying vary, it involves a repeated pattern of harmful behaviors directed towards an individual.

Incivility
Incivility consists of low-intensity discourteous and rude behavior with ambiguous intent to harm that violates norms for appropriate behavior in the workplace.

Sexual harassment
Sexual harassment is behavior that denigrates or mistreats an individual due to his or her gender, creates an offensive workplace, and interferes with an individual being able to do their job.

Stress
Occupational stress concerns the imbalance between the demands (aspects of the job that require mental or physical effort) and resources that help cope with these demands.

Examples

Financial Week reported 5 May 2008 (emphasis added):

Versus systematic bias
In engineering and computational mechanics, the word bias is sometimes used as a synonym of systematic error. In this case, the bias is referred to the result of a measurement or computation, rather than to the measurement instrument or computational method.

Some authors try to draw a distinction between systemic and systematic corresponding to that between unplanned and planned, or to that between arising from the characteristics of a system and from an individual flaw. In a less formal sense, systemic biases are sometimes said to arise from the nature of the interworkings of the system, whereas systematic biases stem from a concerted effort to favor certain outcomes. Consider the difference between affirmative action (systematic) compared to racism and caste (systemic).

See also 

 Bandwagon effect
 Disinformation
 Echo chamber (media)
 Ethnocentrism
 Flag-waving
 Framing (social sciences)
 Funding bias
 Gatekeeping (communication)
 Gender bias on Wikipedia
 Inherent bias
 Institutional racism
 Managing the news
 Media bias
 Media manipulation
 Observational error
 Paradigm shift
 Prejudice
 Propaganda
 Racial bias on Wikipedia
 Spin (public relations)
 Underrepresented groups

References

Further reading
 "Commerce Dept. Accused Of Systemic Bias". By John Files. 6 October 2005. New York Times.
 "Clinton Postpones Inmate's Execution. Systemic Bias To Be Studied". By Deb Riechmann, Associated Press. 8 December 2000. Miami Herald.

 Resources for Confronting Systemic Bias and Racism University of Wisconsin-Madison

Bias
Polling terms